Heterothera is a genus of moths in the family Geometridae described by Inoue in 1943.

Species
 Heterothera comitabilis (Prout, 1923)
 Heterothera consimilis (Warren, 1888)
 Heterothera dentifasciata (Hampson, 1895)
 Heterothera distinctata Choi, 1998
 Heterothera eclinosis Choi, 1998
 Heterothera etes (Prout, 1926)
 Heterothera hoenei Choi, 1998
 Heterothera incerta (Inoue, 1986)
 Heterothera kurenzovi Choi, Viidalepp & Vasjurin, 1998
 Heterothera mussooriensis Choi, 1998
 Heterothera obscurata Choi, 1998
 Heterothera postalbida (Wileman, 1911)
 Heterothera quadrifulta (Prout, 1938)
 Heterothera serraria (Lienig, 1846)
 Heterothera serrataria (Prout, 1914)
 Heterothera sororcula (Bastelberger, 1909)
 Heterothera stamineata Choi, 1998
 Heterothera taigana (Djakonov, 1926)
 Heterothera tephroptilus (D. S. Fletcher, 1961)
 Heterothera triangulata Choi, 1998
 Heterothera undulata (Warren, 1888)
 Heterothera yunnanensis Choi, 1998

References

Cidariini